Severo-Vostochnyye Sady is a rural locality (a khutor) and the administrative center of Kirovskoye Rural Settlement of Maykopsky District, Russia. The population was 3582 as of 2018. There are 40 streets.

Geography 
Severo-Vostochnyye Sady is located 15 km north of Tulsky (the district's administrative centre) by road. Severny is the nearest rural locality.

Ethnicity 
The khutor is inhabited by Russians, Armenians, Adygheans, Ukrainians and Kurds.

References 

Rural localities in Maykopsky District